Prices Fork is a small traditionally agricultural census-designated place (CDP), in Montgomery County, Virginia, United States. The population as of the 2010 Census was 1,066. It is located about three miles west of Blacksburg and the campus of Virginia Polytechnic Institute and State University (Virginia Tech).

The community is a part of the Blacksburg–Christiansburg metropolitan area which encompasses all of Montgomery County and the cities of Blacksburg, Christiansburg, and Radford for statistical purposes.

Prices Fork was named in honor of the local Price, or Preisch, family.

Prices Fork has one church (Prices Fork United Methodist Church), a Grange Hall and an elementary school (grades pre-K through 5th grade). Several structures in the community are designated as historical structures. The Prices Fork Historic District, Evans House No. 2, Joseph McDonald Farm, and Adam Wall House are listed on the National Register of Historic Places.

History
Prices Fork is within the area often referred to as the German New River Settlement, Before 1745, German immigrants moved from Pennsylvania and began settling in this region within the Prices Fork-Tom's Creek area near and along the horseshoe bottoms of the New River. They were among the earliest settlers of European descent in the western section of present-day Virginia. Prices Fork received its name from the Price (Preisch) family, early German settlers here, whose land bordered both sides of the road. Prices Fork evolved into a village during the mid-19th century. Portions of the community's buildings are within the Prices Fork Historic District on the National Register of Historic Places.

References

Census-designated places in Montgomery County, Virginia
Blacksburg–Christiansburg metropolitan area
Census-designated places in Virginia